Guru Gobind Singh Sports College, Lucknow is a residential sports college in Lucknow, Uttar Pradesh. It offers sports training in football, hockey, wrestling, athletics, badminton, swimming and kabaddi in 6th to 12th standard and with the curriculum of U.P. Board. It is the first sports college established in Uttar Pradesh before Beer Bahadur Singh Sports College in Gorakhpur and Etawah's Saifai Sports College.

Notable alumni
Jagbir Singh, field hockey player
Danish Mujtaba, field hockey player
Suresh Raina, cricketer
R. P. Singh, cricketer
Dinesh Patel, baseball pitcher
Rinku Singh, baseball pitcher
Indrajeet Patel, runner
Narendra Hirwani, cricketer
Mritunjay Tripathi, cricketer

See also
Beer Bahadur Singh Sports College
Saifai Sports College
Maharana Pratap Sports College, Dehradun
Motilal Nehru School of Sports, Rai

External links
Official website

References

Sport schools in India
Sport in Uttar Pradesh
Intermediate colleges in Uttar Pradesh
Universities and colleges in Lucknow
Uttar Pradesh Sports Colleges Society
Sport in Lucknow
1975 establishments in Uttar Pradesh
Educational institutions established in 1975